William Ashurst (4 May 1894 – 26 January 1947) was an English professional footballer who made 200 appearances in the Football League for Notts County as a right back. He was capped by England at international level and represented the Football League XI. Ashurst also played league football for Lincoln City and West Bromwich Albion.

Personal life 
Ashurst's younger brother Eli also became a footballer. During the First World War, Ashurst served as a gunner in the Royal Field Artillery and as a private in the Tank Corps.

Career statistics

Honours 
Notts County

 Football League Second Division: 1922–23

References

1894 births
1947 deaths
People from Willington, County Durham
Footballers from County Durham
English footballers
England international footballers
English Football League representative players
Willington A.F.C. players
Leeds City F.C. players
Lincoln City F.C. players
Notts County F.C. players
West Bromwich Albion F.C. players
Newark Town F.C. players
English Football League players
Association football fullbacks
Durham City A.F.C. players
British Army personnel of World War I
Royal Field Artillery soldiers
Royal Tank Regiment soldiers
Military personnel from County Durham